Fiske Planetarium and Science Center is a public museum dedicated to educating the public on astronomy and astrophysics. It is a constituent of the Department of Astrophysical and Planetary Sciences at the University of Colorado Boulder, located in Boulder, Colorado. Fiske was founded in 1975, by a donation from Wallace Franz Fiske. It is located at the Southeast tip of the University of Colorado Boulder.

In 2013, Fiske underwent a major upgrade where the facility retired their 38-year-old, Zeiss Mark VI Star projector to a Megastar Star Ball. They also installed a 6-projector system capable of projecting fulldome 8K films and live renderings of a digital universe.

References

External links
 "Fiske Planetarium flies into the digital age" . University of Colorado News Center.

Museums in Boulder, Colorado
Astronomy museums
Astrophysics
Science museums in Colorado